Governor Wood may refer to:

Edward Wood, 1st Earl of Halifax (1881–1959), Governor-General of India from 1926 to 1931
George Tyler Wood (1795–1858), 2nd Governor of Texas
James Wood (governor) (1741–1813), 11th Governor of Virginia
John Wood (governor) (1798–1880), 12th Governor of Illinois
Leonard Wood (1860–1927), Governor-General of Cuba from 1899 to 1902 and Governor-General of the Philippines from 1921 to 1927
Reuben Wood (1793–1864), 21st Governor of Ohio
Roger Wood (governor) (died 1654), Governor of Bermuda from 1629 to 1637

See also
George Lemuel Woods (1832–1890), 3rd Governor of Oregon